Stevens High School is one of three public high schools in Rapid City, South Dakota, United States. The school opened in November 1969, and has an enrollment of approximately 1600 students. The school is situated in the foothills of South Dakota's Black Hills on the city's western outskirts. The school colors are blue and silver, and the school teams and organizations are known as the "Raiders".

History 
Stevens High School opened in 1969, the second public high school in Rapid City. Located on the west side of town, it was constructed to accommodate the growing student population. The new school was occupied following Thanksgiving in 1969. Stevens High Schools was named for Paul C. Stevens, a Superintendent of the Rapid City Public Schools for fourteen years. Mr. Stevens helped greatly in making the public aware of the need for another high school in Rapid City and is credited with getting the bond issue for the school passed by an overwhelming majority on the first vote. The school has hosted dignitaries such as Pat Nixon in 1972, and President Bill Clinton in 2008.

Music program 
The bands received the John Philip Sousa Foundation's Sudler Flag of Honor, an international award recognizing high school concert bands, in 1985. The marching band performed at the Rose Parade in 1987.

In May 2007, the Jay Sharp Memorial Concert Organ of 103 digital ranks was dedicated in a performance of Saint-Saëns' Organ Symphony #3. Stevens is among a handful of high schools anywhere possessing a large concert organ; a three-manual, 84-stop instrument in the Milo Winter Fine Arts Auditorium. The orchestra regularly fills All State more than any other school. Its success stems from longtime director Bill Evans who started with a group of five players building it over 40 years to a full orchestra with 120 members.

In 2018, the music department received the merit award from the National Association of Music Merchants.

Notable alumni
 Catherine Bach, actress
 Dave Collins, professional baseball player
 Jessi Combs, professional racer, television personality, and metal fabricator
Mike Derby, businessman and member of the South Dakota House of Representatives
 Mark Ellis, professional baseball player
 Chas Fox, professional football player
 Becky Hammon, professional basketball player and coach
 Randy Lewis, Olympic gold medalist-wrestling 1984
 Eric Piatkowski, professional basketball player
 Kelvin Torve, professional baseball player

References

External links
 
 Rapid City Area Schools

Public high schools in South Dakota
Education in Rapid City, South Dakota
Schools in Pennington County, South Dakota
Buildings and structures in Rapid City, South Dakota
Educational institutions established in 1969
1969 establishments in South Dakota